David Michael Portner (born April 24, 1979), also known by his moniker Avey Tare, is a musician and songwriter who co-founded the American experimental pop band Animal Collective. He has released four solo albums, as well as three collaborative albums with Panda Bear (Noah Lennox) which were later retroactively classified under Animal Collective's discography.

Animal Collective
Portner met Animal Collective's Deakin (Josh Dibb), Panda Bear (Noah Lennox), and Geologist (Brian Weitz) in high school. For years, the four of them swapped homemade recordings, shared musical ideas and performed in different group configurations. Portner recorded the Spirit They're Gone, Spirit They've Vanished album with Lennox, and initially released the recording on the band's own Animal label in 1999. The album is commonly referred to as the first official Animal Collective release, with Tare writing the music and Lennox providing the 'perfect percussion' (as cited in the album's credits).

After high school, Portner and Weitz moved to New York City to attend New York University and Columbia University, respectively. Lennox and Dibb eventually moved to New York City, and the band became more collaborative in nature.  They finally settled on the name "Animal Collective".

Although the band's output is, as their name suggests, a collaborative effort, with no typical 'frontman,' Portner has been cited by the other members as being the 'primary songwriter' and de facto leader of the group. For the band's Centipede Hz, Tare confirmed that the album has eight songs penned by him.

Other musical projects

Portner's other projects and releases include Terrestrial Tones with Eric Copeland of Black Dice, a split 12" with David Grubbs, and Pullhair Rubeye, an LP made with his then-wife Kristín Anna Valtýsdóttir, former member of Icelandic band múm. He released his debut solo album, Down There, on October 26, 2010.

In April, 2013, it was announced that Portner had formed the group Avey Tare's Slasher Flicks with Angel Deradoorian, former member of Dirty Projectors, and ex-Ponytail drummer Jeremy Hyman. Portner describes the band as "[a] group of three hippies on a road trip through the backwaters of 2013s rural music scene fall prey to a murderous cannibalistic band making..." Their debut album, Enter the Slasher House, came out internationally on April 7, 2014, and a supporting West Coast tour was announced soon after the album's release. Ahead of the album, they released a video for "Little Fang", directed by Portner's sister and featuring a puppet created by Jim Henson's Creature Shop. In 2017, he appeared on Grateful Dead member Mickey Hart's solo album, RAMU.

Personal life
David's sister is Abby Portner, Los Angeles artist and experimental musician, who creates some of Animal Collective's artwork and stage design.

From 2006 to 2008, Portner was married to Icelandic musician Kristín Anna Valtýsdóttir, also known as Kría Brekkan. Afterwards, he was in a relationship with musician Angel Deradoorian and moved to Los Angeles with her. He currently lives in North Carolina and is in a relationship.

Discography

Studio albums

EPs
 Essence of Eucalyptus (2018, Domino)
 Conference of Birds / Birds in Disguise (2019, Domino)

Singles
 Lucky 1 (October 5, 2010, Paw Tracks)
 Wake My Door (April 8, 2020, Domino)
Pandemic Dream #4 (February 5, 2021, Domino)

Splits
 Split Series #16 (2003, Fat Cat Records) (split 12" with David Grubbs)

Appearances
"Judy Biworker" on the sampler Esopus CD #4: Imaginary Friends (Spring 2005)
"I'm Your Eagle Kisser" on the compilation Living Bridge (February 26, 2008, Rare Book Room Records)
"Call Home (Buy Grapes)" on the cassette tape Keep + Animal Collective (March 2011, Keep)

Collaborations
With Mickey Hart
 RAMU (2017)

With Terrestrial Tones
 Blasted (2005, Psych-o-Path records)
 Oboroed/Circus Lives (2005, UUAR)
 Dead Drunk'' (2006, Paw Tracks)

References

New York University alumni
American rock guitarists
American male guitarists
20th-century American singers
21st-century American singers
American male singers
American multi-instrumentalists
1979 births
Living people
Animal Collective members